Horace Greeley High School is a public, four-year secondary school serving students in grades 9–12 in Chappaqua, New York, United States. It is part of the Chappaqua Central School District.

It is consistently ranked among the top high schools in America. In 2015, it was listed as the No. 1 best public high school in the US by Best Colleges.

Distinctions
Greeley was ranked No. 46 nationally in the 2008 U.S. News & World Report rankings of "America's Best High Schools," and No. 7 among those with open enrollment. It currently offers 17 advanced placement courses.

Recent years have seen approximately one-tenth of graduating seniors recognized by the National Merit Scholarship committee. The class of 2004 included 25 National Merit semi-finalists, the class of 2005 had 16, and the class of 2007 had 22. The mean SAT score among graduating seniors in the Class of 2012 was 1927; 623 in Critical Reading, 652 in Mathematics, 652 in Writing.

The school offers several extracurricular programs. Its academic challenge team won the National Academic Championship in 2003 and 2013, finished third in 2009 and 2010, and placed among the top six teams at the national tournament in five of the six years between 2000 and 2005.  Chip Beall, the organizer of the tournament, noted in 2007 that Greeley's team had "the most airline miles logged at the National Academic Association's expense", a nod to their placement in the final rounds of the tournament more times than any other team in the tournament's history.

The Horace Greeley Debate Team has sent debaters to the state competition every year since its inception in 2002.

The Madrigal Choir, a select group of students auditioned from the full chorus, has attended the Disney Honors festival in Orlando, Florida and has performed with other choirs at such venues as Carnegie Hall and Lincoln Center. In 2011, the Madrigal Choir received a gold award and came in second place at the Boston Heritage Festival.

Programs at Horace Greeley include the LIFE (Learning Independently From Experience) school, an alternative school for grades 11–12 located on campus, and independent study and senior project options. Classes are offered in five foreign languages: Spanish, French, Latin, Chinese, and, at the LIFE school, Italian. The school has been pushed in recent years to eschew classic languages like French and Latin in favor of more practical ones like Chinese. In the 2014–2015 school year, Spanish, French, Latin and Chinese were offered. In the 2005–2006 school year, Ancient Greek was taught for the first time, as an independent study. Students have the opportunity to take Syracuse University Project Advance courses in Earth Systems and Forensic Science. Students may take Marketing and Business & Personal Law for college credit from Mercy College.

As of 2013, Greeley has two sister schools in China: Beijing National Day School and Shanghai Yanjing High School, and offers an exchange program for students interested in traveling to China.

Student clubs 
The school is named for Horace Greeley, the editor of The New York Tribune who made his home in Chappaqua late in life. One of the school's three main publications, The Greeley Tribune, is an additional tribute to the newsman. The school's other two main publications are The Quake, a full color, student-run sports magazine with a staff of over fifty, making it the school's largest publication, and ADVO, a full color, student-run lifestyle and entertainment magazine.

Other student organizations at Greeley include the Model United Nations, One World Study Circle, and community service groups. The largest service groups include S.A.V.E. (Supporting American Veterans Everywhere), S.H.A.R.E., S.A.D.D. (Students Against Destructive Decisions), AAPA (African Anti Poverty Association), Future Business Leaders of America (FBLA), Alliance for Equality (the first gay-straight alliance in Westchester), Students for Social Justice, AIDS Awareness, improvisational comedy troupe The Puritans, Engineering Club, Silent Earth: Greening Greeley, and Amnesty International. Peer leadership is also a popular student/faculty-run organization on campus that gives older students a chance to help acclimate younger students to the high school environment.

Another main club is the Federal Reserve Challenge Club. The Fed Challenge Club is an economic club that sends students every year to the New York Federal Reserve to compete in the fed's annual High School Fed Challenge. Within the 2018–2019 school year, the Fed Challenge Club will branch out to compete in other economic challenges.

The school has three a cappella groups, The Enchords, a co-ed group, the Quaker Notes, an all female group, and the Acafellas, a male group.

Athletics
Among the diverse offerings are varsity programs in baseball, basketball, bowling, field hockey, football, golf, ice hockey, lacrosse, skiing, soccer, softball, swimming and diving, tennis, track and cross country, volleyball, and wrestling.

The school's only state championship came in 2002 and was won by the cross country team. In 2001 the school's football team finished with a record of 11–2, losing 22–15 to Rochester's Aquinas Institute in the New York State Class A State Championship game. The 2002 boys' cross country team won the Class-B title, and remains the only Greeley sports team to win a state championship.

Campus

The school campus is made up of 11 buildings, all are named by letter. Buildings such as the Gym (A Building), Cafeteria (H Building), and Auditorium (B Building) are referred to as such and not by their letter name. Although the building letters span A through L, there is no I Building, for unknown reasons. Multiple athletic fields and a tennis court are also on campus. Horace Greeley High School originally opened in 1928 as part of the K-12 Horace Greeley School, which was located on the present-day site of Robert E. Bell Middle School. The high school's current campus opened in 1957.

Controversy
In 2015, drama teacher Christopher Schraufnagel resigned and was charged with the sexual abuse of three 15-year-old students. The crimes were alleged to have occurred between 2011 and 2015 on campus. The parents of three students subsequently filed a lawsuit against the school district. On November 7, 2016, Schraufnagel pled guilty. On December 21, 2017, Schraufnagel was classified as a level 3 Sex Offender.

Notable alumni

William Ackman (1984), hedge fund investor (Pershing Square Capital Management)
Dwight W. Anderson (1985), investor (Ospraie Management, LLC)
Adam Arkin (c. 1975), actor
Dave Arnold (1989), author, mixology innovator, founder of the Museum of Food and Drink
Scott Arpajian (1988), founder of Download.com, former Disney executive, and CEO, Softonic
Stacey Bendet (1995), founder and CEO of Alice + Olivia
Joe Berlinger (1979), director of the film Metallica: Some Kind of Monster (2004)
Robert Berlinger (1976), director
Bibi Besch, (1959), TV actress seen in multiple Star Trek, Jeff Foxworthy Show, and Falcon Crest episodes
Dan Bucatinsky, (1983), author, producer, and Emmy-winning actor
Knox Burger (1939), editor
Steve Cohen, (1989), magician and author
Richie Erenberg (1980), former football player, Pittsburgh Steelers 1984–87
Roxanne Hart (1969), actress in film and television and on stage, with recurring roles in Dream On, Oz, and Chicago Hope (On the latter series, she played the wife of fellow alumnus Adam Arkin.)
Susan Hockfield (1969), former president (2004–2012) of the Massachusetts Institute of Technology (MIT)
Heather Paige Kent (1986), actress, star of That's Life (2000) and The Real Housewives of Orange County (2012–present)
John Kifner (1959), Williams College, New York Times journalist. Wrote lead piece on Kent State Massacre, among many others. 
Steve Kroft (1963), journalist and correspondent on the TV program 60 Minutes
James Kwak (1986), blogger and University of Connecticut law professor
Brian Leiser (1990), alternative rock and alternative R&B musician, member of Fun Lovin' Criminals
Richard McKelvey (1961), political scientist
Jordan Mechner (1981), game designer, creator of Karateka, Last Express, and the Prince of Persia series
Dan O'Keefe (1986), TV writer for Seinfeld, famous for introducing Festivus
Laurence O'Keefe (1987), composer who co-wrote the Tony Award-nominated music and lyrics for Legally Blonde: The Musical
Mark O'Keefe (1989), screenwriter, including Bruce Almighty (2003) and Click (2006)
Andy Rubin (1981), technology pioneer (hand-held devices), inventor of Android operating system
Margo Schlanger (1985), former government official and University of Michigan law professor
Eric Stangel (1989), a head writer and producer of Late Show with David Letterman
Justin Stangel (1987), a head writer and producer of Late Show with David Letterman
Kevin Wade (1972), screenwriter
Chris Williams (1985), actor
Dar Williams (1985), folk-pop singer-songwriter
Vanessa L. Williams (1981), model, actress and singer

References

External links
School website
School District website
America's Best High Schools Ranking by U.S. News & World Report

Horace Greeley
Public high schools in Westchester County, New York
New Castle, New York